Bachhowal is a medium-size village in Phillaur tehsil of Jalandhar District of Punjab State, India. It is located 9.5 km away from Goraya, 43 km from Jalandhar and 117 km from state capital Chandigarh. Bachhowal has postal head office in Bara Pind which is 10 km away from the village. The village is administrated by a sarpanch who is an elected representative of village as per Panchayati raj (India).

Caste 
The village has schedule caste (SC) constitutes 53.06% of total population of the village and rest 46.94 consist of jatt farmers (GENERAL) and (OBC) it doesn't have any Schedule Tribe (ST) population.

Education 
The village has a Punjabi Medium, Co-educational Primary school (Pri Bachhowal School). The school provide mid-day meal as per Indian Midday Meal Scheme and the meal prepared in school premises. The school was founded in 1970.

Transport

Rail 
Phillaur Junction is the nearest train station however, Bhatian Railway Station is 6 km away from the village.

Air 
The nearest domestic airport is located 37.5 km away in Ludhiana and the nearest international airport is located in Chandigarh also Sri Guru Ram Dass Jee International Airport is the second nearest airport which is 136 km away in Amritsar.

References 

Villages in Jalandhar district
Villages in Phillaur tehsil